"Sadly Mistaken" is a song recorded by Canadian country music artist Cassandra Vasik. It was released in 1993 as the first single from her second studio album, Feels Like Home. The song peaked at number 7 on the RPM Country Tracks chart in May 1993.

Chart performance

Year-end charts

References

1993 songs
1993 singles
Cassandra Vasik songs
Epic Records singles
Songs written by Tim Thorney
Songs written by Erica Ehm